Medial inferior pontine syndrome is a condition associated with a contralateral hemiplegia."Medial inferior pontine syndrome" has been described as equivalent to Foville's syndrome.

Presentation
Although medial pontine syndrome  has many similarities to medial medullary syndrome, because it is located higher up the brainstem in the pons, it affects a different set of cranial nuclei.

Depending upon the size of the infarct, it can also involve the facial nerve.

Cause

Medial pontine syndrome results from occlusion of paramedian branches of the basilar artery.

Diagnosis

Treatment

See also
 Alternating hemiplegia of childhood
 Lateral medullary syndrome
 Lateral pontine syndrome
 Medial medullary syndrome
 Weber's syndrome

References

External links 

Stroke
Syndromes affecting the nervous system